Bix Bottom is a  biological Site of Special Scientific Interest north-west of Henley-on-Thames in Oxfordshire. It is owned and  managed as Warburg Nature Reserve by the Berkshire, Buckinghamshire and Oxfordshire Wildlife Trust.

This site has ancient woods which are shown on a map of 1786, together with areas of grassy clearings and scrub. More than 500 species of vascular plant  have been recorded, including 18 orchids and the rare meadow clary, which is listed in the British Red Data Book of Plants. There are more than 75 bird species and 650 fungi, including many which are nationally rare.

The site is open to the public.

References

 

Sites of Special Scientific Interest in Oxfordshire